Irina Volodymyrivna Kalimbet (later Irina Tikhanova, born 29 February 1968) is a Ukrainian rower who competed for the Soviet Union in the 1988 Summer Olympics. Her husband, Vasily Tikhonov, also competed at the 1988 Olympics in rowing. Their twin daughters Anastasia and Elizaveta are both international rowers.

References 

1968 births
Living people
Sportspeople from Kyiv
Ukrainian female rowers
Soviet female rowers
Rowers at the 1988 Summer Olympics
Olympic silver medalists for the Soviet Union
Olympic rowers of the Soviet Union
Olympic medalists in rowing
World Rowing Championships medalists for the Soviet Union
Medalists at the 1988 Summer Olympics
National University of Ukraine on Physical Education and Sport alumni